These are the international rankings of the United Kingdom.

Indexes grouped by topic
{|class="wikitable" style="text-align:center;"
|-
! style="width:65%;"|Index
! style="width:15%;"|Rank
! style="width:20%;"|Countries reviewed
|-
!colspan=3|Economy
|-
|align="left"|Human Development Index 2015
|14||187
|-
|align="left"|Index of Economic Freedom 2016
|10||167
|-
|align="left"|Inequality adjusted Human Development Index 2015
|13||150
|-
|align="left"|OECD Better Life Index 2016
|16||38
|-
|align="left"|Legatum Prosperity Index 2015
|10||142
|-
|align="left"|Index of Public Integrity 2016
|6||105
|-
|align="left"|Globalization Index 2015
| ||207
|-
|align="left"|Gallup gross median household income 2013
|19||131
|-
|align="left"|Median equivalent adult income 2009–2014
|19||35
|-
|align="left"|International Property Rights Index 2015
|13||129
|-
|align="left"|Logistics Performance Index 2014
|4||160
|-
|align="left"|Networked Readiness Index 2014
|9||144
|-
|align="left"|Household final consumption expenditure per capita 2016
|8||221
|-
|align="left"|Ease of doing business index 2017
|7||185
|-
|align="left"|World Economic Forum 2017
|7||138
|-
|align="left"|Number of billionaires 2016 || 7 || 74
|-
|align="left"|Global Innovation Index 2019 || 5 || 129
|-
!colspan=3|Politics and liberties
|-
|align="left"|Democracy Index 2019
|14||167
|-
|align="left"|Freedom House ranking of political rights 2016
|8||195
|-
|align="left"|Freedom House ranking of civil liberties 2016
| ||195
|-
|align="left"|Fragile States Index (Reverse ranking) 2016
|17||178
|-
|align="left"|Press Freedom Index 2016
|38||180
|-
|align="left"|State of World Liberty Index 2020
|12||187
|-
|align="left"|World Index of Moral Freedom 2020
|38||160
|-
|align="left"|Corruption Perceptions Index 2015
|10||175
|-
!colspan=3|Military
|-
|align="left"|Global Peace Index 2017
|41  6||163
|-
|align="left"|Merchant Navy
|10||39
|-
!colspan=3|Healthcare
|-
|align="left"|Total health expenditure per capita 2015
|17||188
|-
|align="left"|Euro health consumer index 2017
|15||35
|-
!colspan=3|Other
|-
|align="left"|Global Gender Gap Report 2015
|20||144
|-
|align="left"|World Happiness Report 2017
|19  4||157 
|-
|align="left"|Save the Children State of the World's Mothers report 2015
|24||179
|-
|align="left"|Wikipedia page edits 2013 || 4 || 155+
|}

Geographical rankings

See also

References

United Kingdom